G Hall Thu is a 2020 Burmese comedy-drama television series. It is a story of Rangoon Institute of Technology (RIT) (now Yangon Technological University (YTU) ) in 1980s. It aired on MRTV-4, from 19 June to 29 July 2020, on Mondays to Fridays at 19:00 for 29 episodes.

Synopsis
It is based on the popular novel , written by Ma Sandar. G hall, one of the halls of Rangoon Institute of Technology (RIT) in 1980s. The hall number is referred to as the G by G. The students who live in the halls are called "G Hall Thu".

This series is a really compelling series of comedy about the story of the lifestyle, conversation style and happenrence who have been living together for six years at university and G Hall. It is a series that is shown in the background of the university and it is a series that reminds you of a university student life.

Cast

Main
 Hein Htet as Ko Yin Maung
 May Mi Ko Ko as Nyo Htwe
 Great Chan as Khin Cho
 Wyne Shwe Yi as Htwe Htwe
 Han Na Lar as Ma War
 Phyo Than Thar Cho as Wai Wai
 Zu Zu Zan as Ma Ma Khin
 Shwe Sin Wint Shein as Maw Maw
 Hsu Mon (TV presenter) as Mi Mi Lay
 Phone Set Thwin as Mg Mg San
 Shin Mwe La as Lin Nyo
 La Pyae as Vitta
 Wai Yan Kyaw as Kyaw Oo. His nickname is Datta Gi Ri.
 Thura MgCho as Than Win Aung. His nickname is Khaung Ma Sant.
 Soe Htun Win (TV presenter) as Taw Mi

Supporting
 Mike Mike as Nyein Wai
 Min Zay as Htet Oo Maung
 Zaw Htet (TV presenter) as Zaw Lin
 Muu Thiha (TV presenter) as Mg Mg
 Eant Win Htut (TV presenter and Chef) as Dr. Aung Htut
 Phyo May San (TV presenter) as Phyu Phyu Khin
 La Won Htet (TV presenter) as Yu Yu Swe

References

Burmese television series
MRTV (TV network) original programming